A livestock show is an event where livestock are exhibited and judged on certain phenotypical breed traits as specified by their respective breed standard. Species of livestock that may be shown include pigs, cattle, sheep, goats, horses, llamas and alpacas. Poultry such as chickens, geese, ducks, turkeys and pigeons are also shown competitively. A livestock show may be part of an agricultural show.

References
3.   “Livestock.” Livestock | San Antonio Stock Show & Rodeo, www.sarodeo.com/livestock.

4.   Judging Livestock during the 1950s and 60s, livinghistoryfarm.org/farminginthe50s/crops_11.html

Show
Poultry
Animal shows